The 2014 UEFA Women's Champions League Final was the final match of the 2013–14 UEFA Women's Champions League, the 13th season of the UEFA Women's Champions League football tournament and the fifth since it was renamed from the UEFA Women's Cup. The match was held at Estádio do Restelo in Lisbon on 22 May 2014. Reigning champions Wolfsburg played Champions League debutants Tyresö in the final and successfully defended their title.

Wolfsburg played the final for the second consecutive time, while Tyresö managed to reach the final in their first tournament appearance. It also marked the fifth time that a Swedish and a German club meet in the final.

Road to the final

Match details

Statistics

References

Uefa Women's Champions League Final 2014
2014
2013–14 UEFA Women's Champions League
Sports competitions in Lisbon
Uefa
Uefa
2010s in Lisbon
May 2014 sports events in Europe
Uefa Women's Champions League Final 2014